Ali Huseyn oglu Mammadov (11 August 1955 – 1 October 1992) - National Hero of Azerbaijan was born on August 11, 1955, in the Nakhchivan city of Nakhchivan Autonomous Republic of Azerbaijan.

Life
During his youth, his parents moved to Baku where he received his secondary education at School No. 255. In 1975, he passed his military service in Hungary. In 1982, he entered the Police Academy. He worked as a police captain within the Department of Criminal Investigation.

In Battles
Since 1992, Ali Mammadov started to go to the front. On September 24, 1992, he began to fight in the Lachin Rayon. He and other fighters which had captured the Gyzarty height and were subjected to a strong attack in the early morning on October 1, 1992. While bringing out wounded to a safe place, and fighting in the center of the battle, Ali was severely wounded in the head and died at the battlefield.

Family
He was married and had two children.

Awards
He was posthumously awarded the title of the National Hero of Azerbaijan by the decree # 273 of the president of Azerbaijan Republic on 19 October 1992.

He was buried in the Alley of Martyrs in Baku.

One of the streets of Baku is named after Ali Mammadov.

References

External links 

MAMMADOV ALI HUSEYN

1955 births
1992 deaths
People from Nakhchivan
Azerbaijani military personnel
Azerbaijani military personnel of the Nagorno-Karabakh War
Azerbaijani military personnel killed in action
National Heroes of Azerbaijan